Skye, Lochaber and Badenoch is a constituency of the Scottish Parliament (Holyrood) covering  part of the Highland council area. It elects one Member of the Scottish Parliament (MSP) by the first past the post method of election. It is also one of eight constituencies in the Highlands and Islands electoral region, which elects seven additional members, as well as eight constituency MSPs, to produce a form of proportional representation for the region as a whole.

The seat was created for the 2011 Scottish Parliament election, and replaced most of the former constituency of Ross, Skye and Inverness West and part of the former Inverness East, Nairn & Lochaber constituency. The remaining portions of the two former seats (consisting mostly of the less rural area surrounding  and including Inverness) was moved into a new seat called Inverness and Nairn.

The seat has been held by Kate Forbes of the Scottish National Party since the 2016 Scottish Parliament election.

Electoral region 

The Skye, Lochaber and Badenoch constituency is part of the Highlands and Islands electoral region; the other seven constituencies are Argyll and Bute; Caithness, Sutherland and Ross; Inverness and Nairn; Moray; Na h-Eileanan an Iar; Orkney; Shetland. The Highlands and Islands electoral region covers most of Argyll and Bute council area, all of the Highland council area, most of the Moray council area, all of the Orkney Islands council area, all of the Shetland Islands council area and all of Na h-Eileanan Siar.

Constituency boundaries and council area 

The Highland (council area) is represented in the Scottish Parliament by three constituencies:
Caithness, Sutherland and Ross;
Inverness and Nairn; Skye, Lochaber and Badenoch.

The electoral wards used in the newly created constituency of Skye, Lochaber and Badenoch are;

In full: Dingwall and Seaforth; Black Isle; Eilean a’ Cheò; Caol and Mallaig; Aird and Loch Ness; Fort William and Ardnamurchan
In part: Wester Ross, Strathpeffer and Lochalsh; Badenoch and Strathspey

Member of the Scottish Parliament

Election results

Elections in the 2020s 

This was the largest numerical majority at the 2021 Scottish Parliament election.

2010s

Notes and references

External links

Highland constituencies, Scottish Parliament
Scottish Parliament constituencies and regions from 2011
Constituencies of the Scottish Parliament
2011 establishments in Scotland
Constituencies established in 2011
Isle of Skye
Kingussie
Lochaber
Dingwall
Black Isle